
This is a list of the 32 players who earned their 2006 PGA Tour card through Q School in 2005.

Players in yellow are 2006 PGA Tour rookies.

2006 Results

*PGA Tour rookie in 2006
T = Tied 
Green background indicates the player retained his PGA Tour card for 2007 (finished inside the top 125). 
Yellow background indicates the player did not retain his PGA Tour card for 2007, but retained conditional status (finished between 126-150). 
Red background indicates the player did not retain his PGA Tour card for 2007 (finished outside the top 150).

Winners on the PGA Tour in 2006

Runners-up on the PGA Tour in 2006

See also
2005 Nationwide Tour graduates

References
All information from here.
Player Profiles
Money list

PGA Tour Qualifying School
PGA Tour Qualifying School Graduates
PGA Tour Qualifying School Graduates